Brian Dixon is a South African international lawn bowler.

Dixon won the bronze medal in the fours with Clinton Roets and Billy Radloff and Wayne Perry at the 2008 World Outdoor Bowls Championship in Christchurch.

References

South African male bowls players
Living people
Year of birth missing (living people)